The Burmah Oil Company was a leading British oil company which was once a constituent of the FTSE 100 Index. In 1966, Castrol was acquired by Burmah, which was renamed "Burmah-Castrol". BP Amoco (now BP) purchased the company in 2000.

History 

The company was founded in Glasgow in 1886 by David Sime Cargill, an East India merchant, to succeed his Rangoon Oil Company Ltd, also of Glasgow, to further expand and develop oil fields in the Indian subcontinent.  On his death in 1904 the ownership and chairmanship passed to his son Sir John Cargill.

In the 1900s, the Admiralty was projecting a changeover from coal to fuel oil for its warships. In 1905, the company signed a contract with the Admiralty to supply naval fuel oil from Rangoon.

In the first decade of the 20th century, Burmah Oil created a new subsidiary company named Anglo-Persian Oil Company (APOC) to succeed the early prospecting in Persia of William Knox D'Arcy. 97% of the new company's shares were held by Burmah Oil, nearly all by the Cargill family. Burmah Oil became the largest oil company in the British Empire. The subsidiary was later renamed Anglo-Iranian Oil Company, then British Petroleum and eventually BP.

For about a century, the company, through its subsidiaries, played a major role in the oil industry, and in the discovery of oil in the Middle East through its significant influence over British Petroleum. It marketed itself under the BOC brand in Burma, Bangladesh (formerly East Pakistan) and Assam (in India), and through a joint venture Burmah-Shell with Shell in the rest of India.

Until 1901, when the Standard Oil Company started operations in Burma, Burmah Oil enjoyed a monopoly in the region. The company operated in Burma until 1963, when Ne Win nationalized all industries in the country. Based on nationalized assets of Burmah Oil, the Myanma Oil and Gas Enterprise was created.

The company was involved in a landmark legal case in 1964, Burmah Oil Co. v Lord Advocate, concerning compensation for the destruction of oil fields in Burma by British forces in 1942 to avoid them falling into the hands of the invading Japanese army, winning a 3-2 decision in the House of Lords, but the effect of this was specifically reversed by the War Damage Act 1965.

In 1963, the company left Burma and undertook new exploration in India, Pakistan, Bangladesh, Australasia, the Americas, Canada and the North Sea until 1986.  In 1966, Burmah acquired Castrol  renaming it Burmah-Castrol. 

The Bank of England came to the rescue of Burmah Oil after the company made large losses on its tanker fleets in 1974. The core of the rescue operation was the provision of a year's grace so that the company could become smaller and more viable. The Bank of England also agreed to guarantee $650 million of the company's foreign currency borrowings.

In 2000, Burmah was acquired by the then BP Amoco (now renamed BP).

References

Further reading
 A two-volume history of the company was written by T.A.B. Corley: A History of the Burmah Oil Company, 1886–1924 (published 1983) and A History of the Burmah Oil Company. Vol 2, 1924–66 (published 1988).

External links 

 

Anglo-Persian Oil Company
Former BP subsidiaries

Economic history of Myanmar
Non-renewable resource companies established in 1886
1886 establishments in Scotland
Scottish brands
Companies based in Glasgow
Defunct companies of Scotland
Oil and gas companies of Myanmar
Oil and gas companies of Scotland
Oil and gas companies of Bangladesh
2000 mergers and acquisitions